Haedropleura laeta is a species of sea snail, a marine gastropod mollusk in the family Horaiclavidae.

Description

Distribution
This marine species occurs off Sumatra, Indonesia.

References

 Thiele, J. (1929). Handbuch der Systematischen Weichtierkunde. Vol. 1. Erster Teil. Loricata. Gastropoda. I: Prosobranchia (Vorderkeimer). Gustav Fischer, Jena, 376 pp.

External links
  Tucker, J.K. 2004 Catalog of recent and fossil turrids (Mollusca: Gastropoda). Zootaxa 682:1–1295.
 

laeta